Edwill van Aarde is a television and radio broadcaster in South Africa. He is also a sports commentator. He is the presenter and commentator with the longest uninterrupted service at any broadcaster in South Africa, 50 years (in 2011).

Personal life
Van Aarde was born on 20 December 1938 in Kimberley, South Africa.
He grew up in Boetsap. He attended Vaalharts Primary school and Diamantveld High School, where he matriculated in 1957. He is married to Piena Margeretha Forbes Ochse.

Sports commentary
He broadcast 517 cricket games, 134 Rugby matches, 12 Comrades marathons, and 5 Wimbledon men's tennis finals.

Radio
He presented the radio program Afrikaans treffers, which translated means "the biggest hits in South Africa". This was a music program which played the biggest hits from all over the world. This program was 40 years old in 2015.

Television
Van Aarde was the presenter of Flink Dink ("Fast Thinking”), a general knowledge quiz program. He was later also the organiser and researcher of the program.

Attack
He was attacked in his home in Krugersdorp on 29 March 2010. He survived the attack.

References 

1938 births
Living people
People from Kimberley, Northern Cape
South African cricket commentators
South African broadcasters
South African television presenters